is a former Japanese footballer who last played for Albirex Niigata in J1 League.

Club career stats
Updated to 23 February 2017.

References

External links

Profile at Albirex Niigata

1985 births
Living people
Osaka Gakuin University alumni
Association football people from Osaka Prefecture
Japanese footballers
J1 League players
J2 League players
Roasso Kumamoto players
Kashiwa Reysol players
Albirex Niigata players
Association football goalkeepers